Sudbury Hall is a country house in Sudbury, Derbyshire, England. One of the country's finest Restoration mansions, it has Grade I listed building status.

The National Trust Museum of Childhood is housed in the 19th-century servants' wing of Sudbury Hall.

Background 
The Vernon family came to Sudbury as a result of the 16th-century marriage of Sir John Vernon to Ellen Montgomery the Sudbury heiress. The house was built between 1660 and 1680 by George Vernon, grandfather of George Venables-Vernon the 1st Baron Vernon and is notable for its superb Great Staircase, fine Long Gallery, and portraits by John Michael Wright, and of Charles II's mistresses. Inside there is a mixture of architectural styles with carvings by Grinling Gibbons and Edward Pierce (who created the fine staircase), murals by Louis Laguerre and elaborate plasterwork by Samuel Mansfield, James Pettifer and Robert Bradbury. The carvings above the main entrance porch were sculpted by William Wilson. There are formal gardens with a tree-fringed lake.

Cherry Ann Knott has suggested that the design of the hall was based on Crewe Hall in Cheshire, which stands around 1.5 miles from Haslington Hall, where George Vernon was born.

The property was leased for three years from 1840 by Queen Adelaide, the widow of William IV of the United Kingdom. The east wing was added by George Devey in 1876–83. The building is now owned and maintained by the National Trust. to whom it was gifted by the Vernon family in 1967.

The house was used for the internal Pemberley scenes in the BBC dramatisation (1995) of Jane Austen's Pride and Prejudice. The house's centrally-positioned domed cap-house featured in the title shot of Yorkshire Television's children's programme The Book Tower.

See also
Catherine Pegge
George John Venables-Vernon, 5th Baron Vernon
Grade I listed buildings in Derbyshire
Listed buildings in Sudbury, Derbyshire

Notes

References

External links

 Sudbury Hall — The National Trust Museum of Childhood information at the National Trust

 

Children's museums in the United Kingdom
Country houses in Derbyshire
National Trust properties in Derbyshire
Grade I listed buildings in Derbyshire
Grade I listed museum buildings
Historic house museums in Derbyshire
Toy museums in England
Tourist attractions in Derbyshire